2008 Magny-Cours GP2 Series round was a GP2 Series motor race held on June 21 and June 22, 2008 at the Circuit de Nevers Magny-Cours in Magny-Cours, France. It was the fourth race of the 2008 GP2 Series season. The race was used to support the 2008 French Grand Prix.

Classification

Qualifying

Feature race

Sprint race

References

Magny-Cours Gp2 Round, 2008
Magny-Cours
Magny-Cours Gp2 Round